Police Bank Ltd.  is an Australian, member-owned mutual bank. Founded as NSW Police Credit Union (PCU) on 24 October 1964 by a group of officers from the Clarence Street Police Station in Sydney, its members passed a resolution to enable "Police Credit Union" to become "Police Bank Ltd." on 3 December 2012.

Membership with Police Bank is open to employees and their relatives, as well as friends of the NSW Police Force, Australian Federal Police, Emergency Management Australia, Corrective Services NSW, Australian Courts, or any other area of law enforcement and associated services. Police Bank also offers membership to employees of the Australian Customs and Border Protection Service as well as Australian Quarantine and Inspection Service under their "Customs Bank" subsidiary.

Police Bank is a member of The Customer Owned Banking Association, the industry body representing the Australian mutual and cooperative banking sector. Police Bank is a member-owned institution and has no shareholders.

Police Bank is supervised by the Australian Prudential Regulation Authority (APRA), and is among the 21 Australian-owned banks.

Sponsorship 
Police Bank runs a sponsorship program providing financial support to the police community and to charitable sporting organizations.

Police Bank is a major sponsor of NSW Police Legacy, which provides support to the families of deceased and terminally ill police officers. Police Bank also provides NSW Police Legacy financial and corporate support. They are a major sponsor of the NSW Police Games, an annual competitive athletic event incorporating sports from a number of NSW Police Sporting Clubs.

Awards

References

External links 

 
 Police Bank Ltd entry in member directory of Customer Owned Banking Association

Banks of Australia
Mutual savings banks in Australia
Financial services companies based in Sydney